Schnyder is used in Switzerland as an alternative form of the more common German surname Schneider (tailor). Immigrants to North America often spelled their name as Snyder.

 Daniel Schnyder (born 1961), Swiss jazz musician and composer
 Fabian Schnyder (born 1985), Swiss ice hockey player
 Franz Schnyder (1910–1993), Swiss film director
 Franz Xaver Schnyder von Wartensee (1786–1868), Swiss composer
 Josef Schnyder (1923–2017), Swiss cross country skier 
 Nicole Schnyder-Benoit (born 1973), retired professional beach volleyball player
 Oliver Schnyder (born 1973), Swiss pianist
 Patty Schnyder (born 1978), Swiss tennis player

Occupational surnames
German-language surnames